Eupera yucatanensis is a species of mollusc that lives in fresh water. E. yucatanensis has one subspecies, E. y. minima. The description of E. yucatanensis was not documented. The species status is uncertain due to the undocumentation of the species. The subspecies is also uncertain. The subspecies was discovered in 1920 by Pilsbry.

References 

Sphaeriidae